Invertase is an enzyme that catalyzes the hydrolysis (breakdown) of sucrose (table sugar) into fructose and glucose. Alternative names for invertase include , saccharase, glucosucrase, beta-h-fructosidase, beta-fructosidase, invertin, sucrase, maxinvert L 1000, fructosylinvertase, alkaline invertase, acid invertase, and the systematic name: beta-fructofuranosidase.  The resulting mixture of fructose and glucose is called inverted sugar syrup. Related to invertases are sucrases. Invertases and sucrases hydrolyze sucrose to give the same mixture of glucose and fructose. Invertase is a glycoprotein that hydrolyses (cleaves) the non-reducing terminal beta-fructofuranoside residues. Thus, its systematic name is beta-fructofuranosidase. Invertases cleave the O-C(fructose) bond, whereas the sucrases cleave the O-C(glucose) bond. Invertase cleaves the alpha-1,2-glycosidic bond of sucrose.

For industrial use, invertase is usually derived from yeast. It is also synthesized by bees, which use it to make honey from nectar. Optimal temperature at which the rate of reaction is at its greatest is 60 °C and an optimum pH of 4.5.  Typically, sugar is inverted with sulfuric acid.

Production 
Invertase is produced by various organisms like yeast, fungi, bacteria, higher plants, and animals. For example: S. cerevisiae, Saccharomyces carlsbergensis, S. pombe, Aspergillus spps, Penicillium chrysogenum, Azotobacter spps, Lactobacillus spps, Pseudomonas spps etc.

For industrial use, invertase is usually derived from yeast.

Applications and examples
Invertase is used to produce inverted sugar syrup.

Invertase is expensive, so it may be preferable to make fructose from glucose using glucose isomerase, instead.

Chocolate-covered cherries, other cordials, and fondant candies include invertase, which liquefies the sugar. Once the candy is manufactured, it needs at least a few days to a few weeks in storage so the invertase has time to break down the sucrose.

Invertase enzyme is also used in ethanol production, cosmetics, drugs etc. and also in the food industry.

Inhibition 
Urea acts as a non-competitive inhibitor of invertase, presumably by breaking the intramolecular hydrogen bonds contributing to the tertiary structure of the enzyme.

See also 
List of enzymes

References

External links 

EC 3.2.1
Food additives
E-number additives